Pierre Côme André Segrétain (7 November 1909 – 8 October 1950) was a French infantry and airborne officer of the French Army who fought in World War II and the First Indochina War, primarily in Foreign Legion units. He received command of the 1st Foreign Parachute Battalion (1er BEP) when the battalion was created in 1948 and led for two years in Indochina before being fatally wounded while leading his battalion during the Battle of Route Coloniale 4.

Early life
Pierre Segretain was born in a French military family. His father was a colonel, his grandfather a division general of the French military engineers. Pierre passed 2 years of corniche at the lycée Sainte Geneviève de Versailles before integrating École spéciale militaire de Saint-Cyr in 1930.

Military career

Prior WW II 

Saint-Cyrien from Général Joseph Joffre promotion, Pierre was affected to the 35th Infantry Regiment at Belfort as platoon commander (lieutenant) then transmission officer. In May 1936, he volunteered for service in the 1st Foreign Regiment 1er RE at Sidi-bel-Abbès; the Legion. Pierre got introduced to the battle campaigns of Algeria and Morocco with the 2nd Foreign Infantry Regiment 2ème REI in 1938 and the 6th Foreign Infantry Regiment 6ème REI in 1939.

World War II

With the outbreak of World War II, Lieutenant Segrétain belonged to the Foreign Legion group of the French Levant and volunteered to fight in metropole France. It is with the 20th Colonial Infantry Regiment at Saint-Gervais, where he received his baptism of fire. Pierre's bravery and efficiency proved exemplary in showcasing morale support for the ensemble of the troops and would bring forth his first citation. A difficult period commenced for Captain Segrétain, since in December 1940, he sailed to Beirut to join the 6th Foreign Infantry Regiment 6ème REI with whom which he fought against the British and Free French Forces in the Syria-Lebanon Campaign.

Little after the allied Disembarking in North Africa in 1942, Pierre's regiment sided this time with the Allies and engaged in the Tunisia Campaign against the Afrika Korps of Rommel. At Loukanda, he led his combat company facing a superiorly numbered and better-equipped enemy. In July 1943, Pierre participated to the creation and reforming of the Marching Regiment of the Foreign Legion (R.M.L.E) with whom, he disembarked at Provence, delivered the Franche-Comté and progressed till Danube. Pierre would be made knight of the order of the Legion of Honor.

Indochina War

 1er Bataillon Étranger de Parachutistes, 1er BEP (1948-1955)

In 1945, Pierre rejoined Coëtquidan, where, as unit Commandant, he was in charge for training transmission units. The Segrétain family lived 2 years of peace. After earning his French paratrooper brevet at Pau, captain Segrétain was assigned to the 1st Parachute Chasseur Regiment 1er RCP.

A Legion officer formed at the evolutions of the infantry, Pierre was the first commander 1er Chef of the 1st Foreign Parachute Battalion 1er BEP, created on 1 July 1948 at Khamisis, creating also the battalion insignia. On November 1948, the battalion departed to Indochina. With Captain Pierre Jeanpierre seconding command of the 1er BEP, Segrétain led numerous operations in the Tonkin.

During September 1950, Segrétain alerted command of the three strong positions of artillery while his men picked up their traces at the frontier. The 1er BEP received for mission to retake the town of Dong Khe on colonial route 4 (RC4) while assuring liaison with That Khe situated at 20 km south. While facing a superior enemy in numbers, the 1er BEP would have to make movement towards the cuvette of Coc Xa; surrounded by rocks and vegetation, the 1er BEP (I formation) delivered the first traditional Foreign Legion battlefield of the First Indochina War throughout which the entire battalion was annihilated. Battalion commander Chef de bataillon Segrétain commanded his unit till his last effort. Pierre died of his mortal wounds during the night of 7–8 October 1950, while the remaining survivors of the battalion were filtering across enemy lines to win back That Khe.

Honours and awards
Knight of the Légion d'honneur.
Croix de guerre 1939-1945 with silver star.
Croix de guerre des Théatres d'Opérations Extérieures with 3 palms.
He received 8 citations during his career.

Legacy

Posthumous homages

Promotion class "Chef de bataillon Segretain" École militaire interarmes ESM 

The 193rd promotion of the École spéciale militaire de Saint-Cyr chose the promotion Chef de bataillon Segretain. The song of the promotion recalls the arms celebration of Chef de bataillon Segretain.

Pierre Segrétain - Gallery

See also 
Major (France)
Music of the Foreign Legion (MLE)

References

External links 
History of the 1st Parachute Chasseur Regiment, 9th Parachute Chasseur Regiment, 14th Parachute Chasseur Regiment and 18th Parachute Chasseur Regiment

1909 births
1950 deaths
People from Saint-Mihiel
Officers of the French Foreign Legion
French military personnel of World War II
French military personnel of the First Indochina War
École Spéciale Militaire de Saint-Cyr alumni
Chevaliers of the Légion d'honneur
Recipients of the Croix de Guerre 1939–1945 (France)
Recipients of the Croix de guerre des théâtres d'opérations extérieures
French military personnel killed in the First Indochina War